Burton Blair Gullion (December 22, 1901 – January 30, 1959) was an American college basketball player and coach. He was head coach for Earlham College, the University of Tennessee, Cornell University, the University of Connecticut and Washington University in St. Louis. He was also a president of the National Association of Basketball Coaches (NABC).

Guillion played college basketball for Purdue from 1921 to 1924, leading the Big Ten Conference in scoring in 1922. Following his playing career, Gullion coached at the high school level and in 1927 was named head coach for Earlham College. He coached there for eight seasons and led the program to its only undefeated season in school history, going 15–0 in the 1932–33 campaign.

Following his time at Earlham, Gullion moved to Tennessee, where he went 47–19 over three seasons, and then Cornell, where he went 48–43 over four seasons. Gullion's coaching career was put on hold during World War II, as he served as a major in the Air Force, primarily overseeing physical education programs.

After the war, Gullion was named head coach at Connecticut in 1946 and was named president of the NABC. He left to become head coach and athletic director for Washington University. He led the basketball program for eleven seasons, compiling a 109–87 record from 1947 to 1959. Gullion died during his tenure as Bears' coach and AD on January 30, 1959, of a heart attack.

A respected basketball mind throughout his career, Gullion authored three books on the game and in 1971 was posthumously inducted to the Indiana Basketball Hall of Fame.

Head coaching record

References

External links
 Coaching record @ sports-reference.com
 Earlham Quakers Athletic HOF profile

1901 births
1959 deaths
American men's basketball coaches
American men's basketball players
Basketball coaches from Indiana
Basketball players from Indiana
Centers (basketball)
College men's basketball head coaches in the United States
Cornell Big Red men's basketball coaches
Earlham Quakers men's basketball coaches
High school basketball coaches in the United States
People from Elwood, Indiana
Purdue Boilermakers men's basketball players
Tennessee Volunteers basketball coaches
UConn Huskies men's basketball coaches
United States Army Air Forces personnel of World War II
Washington University Bears athletic directors
Washington University Bears men's basketball coaches